The following is a list of Government Houses  of South Africa.

Transvaal, Government House of Transvaal
Cape Province, Government House of Cape Province
Orange Free State, Government House, Bloemfontein
Natal, Government House of Natal

See also
Government Houses of the British Empire